Bargachhia is a census town of Nalikul Purba Gram Panchayat in Haripal CD Block in Chandannagore subdivision of Hooghly district in the Indian state of West Bengal.

Geography

Location

The area is composed of flat alluvial plains that form a part of the Gangetic Delta.

Urbanisation
In Chandannagore subdivision 58.52% of the population is rural and the urban population is 41.48%. Chandannagore subdivision has 1 municipal corporation, 3 municipalities and 7 census towns. The single municipal corporation is Chandernagore Municipal Corporation. The municipalities are Tarakeswar Municipality, Bhadreswar Municipality and Champdany Municipality. Of the three CD Blocks in Chandannagore subdivision, Tarakeswar CD Block is wholly rural, Haripal CD Block is predominantly rural with just 1 census town, and Singur CD Block is slightly less rural with 6 census towns. Polba Dadpur and Dhaniakhali CD Blocks of Chinsurah subdivision (included in the map alongside) are wholly rural. The municipal areas are industrialised. All places marked in the map are linked in the larger full screen map.

Transport
Main transport facilities are Indian Railways and bus services. Nearest railway station is Nalikul located inside the southwest part of the census town. The CT is bounded in the south by SH 2.

Education
One upper primary school named Bargachhia Upper Primary School and one Higher Secondary school named Nalikul Desh Bandhu Bani Mandir are located in the Census Town. Also there are several privet institutions in the locality. Those are Green View Institution, Jeevan Jyoti, Next Gen Educational Institution etc.

Health Infrastructures
One sub center is located in this area. Nearest PHC is Bandipur PHC about 2 KM away from the Census Town. Two rural hospitals are situated about 9 KM away towards east Singur RH and 8 KM away towards west Haripal RH.

Demographics
As per 2011 Census of India Bargachhia had a total population of 4,566 of which 2,350 (51%) were males and 2,216 (49%) were females. Population below 6 years was 422. The total number of literates in Bargachhia was 3,391 (81.83% of the population over 6 years).

References

Cities and towns in Hooghly district